Untitled is a 1986 stainless steel sculpture by Ellsworth Kelly, installed at the Hirshhorn Museum and Sculpture Garden, in Washington, D.C., United States. The sculpture measures  x  x .

See also
 1986 in art
 List of public art in Washington, D.C., Ward 2

References

External links
 

1986 sculptures
Hirshhorn Museum and Sculpture Garden
Sculptures of the Smithsonian Institution
Outdoor sculptures in Washington, D.C.
Stainless steel sculptures in the United States
Steel sculptures in Washington, D.C.